The  is a twin-bore motorway tunnel on the Chūō Expressway located on the border of the cities of Kōshū and Ōtsuki in Yamanashi Prefecture, Japan. It was built in 1977.

Ceiling collapse 
At approximately 8 am on December 2, 2012, nearly 150 concrete ceiling panels inside the Tokyo-bound Sasago Tunnel collapsed, crushing three vehicles, including a van, carrying six persons, that caught fire. Smoke could be seen billowing from the Kōshū entrance to the tunnel.

Nine people died and two were injured, making it the deadliest roadway accident in Japanese history. The tunnel was closed for a period of 27 days for repairs and removal of ceiling panels, before the south tube reopened on December 29. The north tube, where the collapse happened, reopened on February 8, 2013.

The nature of the collapse closely resembled a similar ceiling collapse in the Fort Point Channel Tunnel in Boston, Massachusetts in 2006.

References

External links

Buildings and structures in Yamanashi Prefecture
Roads in Yamanashi Prefecture
Road tunnels in Japan
Tunnel disasters
2012 industrial disasters
December 2012 events in Japan
Tunnels completed in 1977
Road incidents in Japan
2012 road incidents
Kōshū, Yamanashi 
Ōtsuki, Yamanashi